William John O'Neill (January 22, 1880 – July 20, 1920) was an outfielder in Major League Baseball who played for the Boston Americans (1904), Washington Senators (1904) and Chicago White Sox (1906). O'Neill was a switch-hitter and threw right-handed. He was born in Saint John, New Brunswick,  Canada.

Playing at shortstop in his 1904 rookie season for the Red Sox, O'Neill committed six errors during a 13-inning 5–3 loss to the St Louis Browns on May 21 to become the only 20th-century Major League player to record six errors in a game. In the midseason he was traded to Washington in the same transaction that brought Kip Selbach to Boston. In 1906 O'Neill was a member of the Chicago White Sox team that won the World Championship over the Chicago Cubs in six games.

In a two-season career, O'Neill was a .243 hitter with two home runs and 42 RBI in 206 games played.

O'Neill died in Woodhaven, New York, at the age of 40.

See also
List of Major League Baseball players from Canada

References

External links
Baseball References
Baseball Almanac
Retrosheet

1880 births
1920 deaths
Boston Americans players
Canadian expatriate baseball players in the United States
Chicago White Sox players
Washington Senators (1901–1960) players
Major League Baseball outfielders
Major League Baseball players from Canada
Canadian baseball players
Canadian sportspeople of Irish descent
Major League Baseball center fielders
Major League Baseball right fielders
Baseball people from New Brunswick
Sportspeople from Saint John, New Brunswick
Milwaukee Brewers (minor league) players
Lynn Shoemakers players
Minneapolis Millers (baseball) players
Louisville Colonels (minor league) players